The Black Forest Girl (German: Schwarzwaldmädel) is a 1920 German silent drama film directed by Arthur Wellin and starring Uschi Elleot, Gustav Charle and Carl Neisser. The film is based on the 1917 operetta of the same title, composed by Leon Jessel with a libretto by August Neidhart. It is one of a number of adaptations that have been made.

Cast
 Uschi Elleot as Bärbele
 Gustav Charle as	Domkapellmeister
 Carl Neisser as	Schmußheim
 Edward Eyseneck as 	Hans
 Oskar Linke	
 Emil Stammer		
 Ria Jende

References

Bibliography
 Ashkenazi, Ofer. Anti-Heimat Cinema: The Jewish Invention of the German Landscape. University of Michigan Press, 2020.
 Ludewig, Alexandra. Screening Nostalgia: 100 Years of German Heimat Film. transcript Verlag, 2014.

External links

1920 films
Films of the Weimar Republic
German silent feature films
German drama films
Films directed by Arthur Wellin
1920 drama films
German black-and-white films
Silent drama films
1920s German films

de:Schwarzwaldmädel (1920)